The South Africa cricket team toured India in September and October 2019 to play three Tests and three Twenty20 International (T20I) matches. The Test series formed part of the inaugural 2019–2021 ICC World Test Championship.

In August 2019, Cricket South Africa confirmed that Faf du Plessis would lead the Test side for the tour, with Quinton de Kock named captain of the T20I team. Later the same month, as per the request of the Jharkhand Cricket Association, due to Durga Puja celebrations in the second week of October in Ranchi, the Committee of Administrators (CoA) agreed to switch the venues of the second and third Tests. Pune, which was originally scheduled to host the third Test, hosted the second Test, with Ranchi hosting the third Test match.

The three-match T20I series was drawn 1–1, after the first fixture was washed out. In the Test series, India won the first two matches to take an unassailable 2–0 lead. It was India's eleventh-consecutive series win at home, setting a new record for any team in Test cricket. India won the final Test by an innings and 202 runs to win the series 3–0. It was India's first whitewash in a bilateral Test series against South Africa. South Africa lost the last two Tests by an innings. The last time they had lost consecutive Test matches by an innings margin was during Australia's visit in 1935–36.

South Africa returned to India in March 2020 to play three One Day International (ODI) matches. On 6 March 2020, Cricket South Africa announced that the trip to India for the ODI matches would still go ahead, despite the COVID-19 pandemic. After the first ODI, which was abandoned with no play due to rain, the Board of Control for Cricket in India (BCCI) confirmed that the two remaining ODIs would be played behind closed doors, in an attempt to reduce the impact of the coronavirus. However, on 13 March 2020, the remaining two ODI matches were cancelled.

Squads

Ahead of the tour, Rudi Second was ruled out of South Africa's Test squad due to injury. He was replaced by Heinrich Klaasen. JJ Smuts was also ruled out of South Africa's T20I squad due to fitness concerns, and was replaced by George Linde. Jasprit Bumrah was ruled out of India's Test squad due to a stress fracture, with Umesh Yadav replacing him. Ahead of the third and final Test, Keshav Maharaj was ruled out of South Africa's squad with a shoulder injury, and was replaced by George Linde. Shahbaz Nadeem was added to India's squad for the third Test, as cover for Kuldeep Yadav. Ahead of the ODI series, Janneman Malan was added to South Africa's squad.

Tour match

Three-day match: Indian Board President's XI vs South Africa

T20I series

1st T20I

2nd T20I

3rd T20I

Test series

1st Test

2nd Test

3rd Test

ODI series

1st ODI

2nd ODI

3rd ODI

Notes

References

External links
 Series home at ESPN Cricinfo

2019 in Indian cricket
2020 in Indian cricket
2019 in South African cricket
2020 in South African cricket
International cricket competitions in 2019–20
South African cricket tours of India
Cricket events postponed due to the COVID-19 pandemic